Chakola is a rural locality (a village) in Pirinemskoye Rural Settlement of Pinezhsky District, Arkhangelsk Oblast, Russia. The population was 98 as of 2010. There are 2 streets.

Geography 
Chakola is located on the Pinega River, 55 km north of Karpogory (the district's administrative centre) by road. Gorodok is the nearest rural locality.

References 

Rural localities in Pinezhsky District